Iranian/Persian traditional music (also known as mūsīqī-e sonnatī-e īrānī or mūsīqī-e aṣīl-e īrānī) is now modernly classified into the Dastgāh system. This system is a modal system, in the fact that it utilizes distinct modes of music, in this case seven. Each of these seven modes, referred to as Dastgāh, are then classified into smaller units (usually only one), each called an āvāz. Every āvāz consists of short pieces and melodies of music called the gousheh that, although each has its own characteristics, share one central characteristic in the āvāz.

The seven main Dastgāh of Iranian music are modernly known as Shour, Māhour, Homāyoun, Segāh, Chāhārgāh, Rāstpanjgāh, and Navā. Each of these seven is considered to be its own āvāz. Yet, Dastgāh-e Shour also contains the four āvāz-e Abou'atā, āvāz-e Bayāt-e-Tork, āvāz-e Afshāri, and āvāz-e Dashti along with its own āvāz-e Shour. Similarly, Dastgāh-e Homāyoun contains both āvāz-e Homāyoun and āvāz-e Esfahān. Shour is mainly considered the mother of all Dastgāh. 

The classification is as below:

Dastgāh-e Šur (mother of all Dastgāh)
Āvāz-e Dashti
Āvāz-e Abou'atā
Āvāz-e Bayāt-e Tork
Āvāz-e Bayāt-e Kord
Āvāz-e Afshāri
Dastgāh-e Homāyoun
Āvāz-e Bayāt-e Esfahān
Dastgāh-e Segāh (third place)
Dastgāh-e Chāhārgāh (fourth place)
Dastgāh-e Rāstpanjgāh (fifth place)
Dastgāh-e Māhur
Dastgāh-e Navā
A complete book in Iranian traditional music is called the radif, which consists of all seven Dastgāh. Such a radif would traditionally be written by the master, the ostād, and then played, learned, and thoroughly memorized by the apprentice before he could become a master. Each radif consists of approximately 200–400 gousheh.

References
Lashgari, Manouchehr. Radif of Iranian Music. Chang Publications, 2003, p. 3.

Iranian music